Anthony Coombs Raymond (June 21, 1798 – June 13, 1879) was an American architect active in the first half of the 19th century. He was responsible for several churches and homes in the area of the Kennebec River in Maine.

Life and career 
Raymond was born in Harpswell, Maine, on June 21, 1798, to Edward Raymond and Lydia Coombs.

He began his career as an architect at the age of 18.

In 1821, he married Aletta Alexander, but she died nine years later, aged 27 or 28. He married again, to Mary Whitehouse.

His work on the  Universalist Church in Bath, Maine, resulted in his moving to the community.

Death 
Raymond died on June 13, 1879, in Bath, Maine. He was 80 years old. He is interred in Growstown Cemetery in Brunswick, Maine, alongside both of his wives. Mary survived him by twenty years.

Selected notable works 

 Maine Hall, Bowdoin College, Brunswick, Maine (1836)
 North Yarmouth and Freeport Baptist Meetinghouse, Yarmouth, Maine (1837 alteration)
 Universalist Church, Bath, Maine (1839)
 Winter Street Church, Bath, Maine (1843)

References 

1798 births
1879 deaths
19th-century American architects
Architects from Maine